Kunsthal Charlottenborg   is an exhibition building in Copenhagen, Denmark. It is the official exhibition gallery of the Royal Danish Academy of Art.

History
Charlottenborg Palace was constructed in 1672–83 as a  residence for Ulrik Frederik Gyldenløve (1638–1704). It was constructed in the Baroque architectural idiom shared by Holland, England and Denmark. . Dowager queen Charlotte Amalie (1650–1714) bought the palace in 1700, and her name has remained with it ever since.  In 1787, the ownership of the Palace was transferred to the Royal Danish Academy of Art.

The corps de logis was rebuilt facing Kongens Nytorv in 1827 under design by architect Christian Frederik Hansen (1756–1845), and contains the Academy's Festhall and Antiksalen.  Kunsthal Charlottenborg  has become famous for its Charlottenborg Spring Exhibition, to which anyone may submit work, which is vetted by a jury before a selection is shown. The fall exhibition, Efterårsudstilling, is by invitation.

References

External links
Kunsthal Charlottenborg website

Art museums and galleries in Copenhagen
Culture in Copenhagen
Tourist attractions in Copenhagen
Royal Danish Academy of Fine Arts
Art exhibitions in Denmark